Cerro Largo may refer to:

Cerro Largo, Rio Grande do Sul, Brazil
Cerro Largo, Herrera, Panama
Cerro Largo Department, Uruguay
Cerro Largo F.C., Uruguay

See also